Sunbeam College for Women is a women's degree college in Bhagawanpur, Varanasi, India. The college imparts undergraduate education.

History 
Sunbeam College for Women is a part of the Sunbeam Group of Educational Institutions. The college was established and opened in 2000 by Deepak Madhok who also is the President of the college. The college has 22 classrooms and also has hostel facility on campus.

Courses 
The college offers the following courses:

 Undergraduate courses in Commerce (B.Com), Science (B.Sc.) and in Information technology (B.C.A.).

See also 
 List of educational institutions in Varanasi

References 

2000 establishments in Uttar Pradesh
Educational institutions established in 2000
Women's universities and colleges in Uttar Pradesh
Universities and colleges in Varanasi
Colleges in India